The 2019 Superbike World Championship (known as 2019 MOTUL FIM Superbike World Championship for sponsorship reasons) was the 32nd season of the Superbike World Championship.

Competition format
A new race format was introduced for the 2019 season. As in 2018, two normal length races (Race 1 and Race 2) were held – one each on Saturday and Sunday (Friday and Saturday in Qatar). A third race, a ten lap sprint named the Superpole Race, was held on the final morning of the weekend prior to Race 2. The starting grids for Race 1 and the Superpole Race were determined by a single 25-minute Superpole Qualifying session. The grid for Race 2 featured the top nine riders in the Superpole Race in the order in which they finished followed by the remaining riders sorted by their Superpole Qualifying times.

Race calendar and results
A provisional 13-event calendar (of which one race was unconfirmed) was announced on 13 November 2018, with one round change from 2018 as the Czech round at Brno was replaced by a round at Jerez, to be held in June. As well as this, the round at Donington Park was moved from May to July, with the Misano round moving forward into June to accommodate this. On 19 December 2018, the thirteenth round was confirmed at WeatherTech Raceway Laguna Seca, having initially been dropped for 2019.

Entry list
An 18-rider provisional permanent entry list was released by Dorna Sports on 11 January 2019.

All entries used Pirelli tyres.

Championship standings
Points were awarded as follows:
Race 1 and Race 2

Superpole Race

Riders' championship

Bold – Pole positionItalics – Fastest lap

Manufacturers' championship

Notes

References

External links 

Superbike
Superbike
Superbike World Championship seasons